The 1918 League Island Marines football team represented the United States Marine Corps stationed at the League Island Navy Yard in Philadelphia during the 1918 college football season. The team was coached by Byron W. Dickson. A game scheduled for October 19 against Villanova was cancelled due to Spanish flu quarantine.

The 1919 edition of the Spalding's Official Foot Ball Guide indicates that Dickson coached a Marine team that disbanded after beating Penn on October 26, and afterward, a League Island Navy Yard team was formed, which went 6–0 beginning with a victory over Lehigh on November 2. Contemporary newspapers accounts do not appear to make a distinction between the two teams.

Schedule

References

League Island Marines
College football undefeated seasons
League Island Marines football